The Seidelmann 295 is an American sailboat that was designed by Bob Seidelmann as a cruiser and first built in 1982.

Production
The design was built by Seidelmann Yachts in the United States, from 1982 until 1986, but it is now out of production.

Design
The Seidelmann 295 is a recreational keelboat, built predominantly of fiberglass, with wood trim. It has a masthead sloop rig, a raked stem, a plumb transom, a transom-hung rudder controlled by a tiller and a fixed stub keel with a  retractable centerboard. It displaces  and carries  of ballast.

The design has sleeping accommodation for six people, with a double "V"-berth in the bow cabin and dual fold-out settee berths in the main cabin, with a fold-away table. The galley is located on the starboard side just forward of the companionway ladder. The galley is "L"-shaped and is equipped with a two-burner stove, icebox and a sink. The head is located just aft of the bow cabin on the port side. The cabin sole is made from teak and holly.

See also
List of sailing boat types

References

Keelboats
1980s sailboat type designs
Sailing yachts
Sailboat type designs by Bob Seidelmann
Sailboat types built by Seidelmann Yachts